Max Erik Tegmark (born 5 May 1967) is a Swedish-American physicist, cosmologist and machine learning researcher. He is a professor at the Massachusetts Institute of Technology and the president of the Future of Life Institute. He is also a scientific director at the Foundational Questions Institute and a supporter of the effective altruism movement.

Biography

Early life
He was born in Sweden to Karin Tegmark and American-born professor of mathematics Harold S. Shapiro. While in high school, Tegmark and a friend created and sold a word processor written in pure machine code for the Swedish eight-bit computer ABC 80, and a 3D Tetris-like game called Frac.

Tegmark left Sweden in 1990 after receiving his M.Sc. in Engineering physics from the Royal Institute of Technology. (He had earned a B.A. in economics the previous year at the Stockholm School of Economics.) His first academic venture beyond Scandinavia brought him to California, where he studied physics at the University of California, Berkeley, earning his M.A. in 1992, and Ph.D. in 1994 under the supervision of Joseph Silk.

He worked as an assistant professor at the University of Pennsylvania receiving tenure in 2003. In 2004, he joined Massachusetts Institute of Technology Department of Physics.

Career
His research has focused on cosmology, combining theoretical work with new measurements to place constraints on cosmological models and their free parameters, often in collaboration with experimentalists. He has over 200 publications, of which nine have been cited over 500 times. He has developed data analysis tools based on information theory and applied them to cosmic microwave background experiments such as COBE, QMAP, and WMAP, and to galaxy redshift surveys such as the Las Campanas Redshift Survey, the 2dF Survey and the Sloan Digital Sky Survey.

With Daniel Eisenstein and Wayne Hu, he introduced the idea of using baryon acoustic oscillations as a standard ruler. With Angelica de Oliveira-Costa and Andrew Hamilton, he discovered the anomalous multipole alignment in the WMAP data sometimes referred to as the "axis of evil". With Anthony Aguirre, he developed the cosmological interpretation of quantum mechanics. His 2000 paper on quantum decoherence of neurons
concluded that decoherence seems too rapid for Roger Penrose's "quantum microtubule" model of consciousness to be viable.
Tegmark has also formulated the "Ultimate Ensemble theory of everything", whose only postulate is that "all structures that exist mathematically exist also physically". This simple theory, with no free parameters at all, suggests that in those structures complex enough to contain self-aware substructures (SASs), these SASs will subjectively perceive themselves as existing in a physically "real" world. This idea is formalized as the mathematical universe hypothesis, described in his book Our Mathematical Universe.

Tegmark was elected Fellow of the American Physical Society in 2012 for, according to the citation, "his contributions to cosmology, including precision measurements from cosmic microwave background and galaxy clustering data, tests of inflation and gravitation theories, and the development of a new technology for low-frequency radio interferometry".
He was awarded the Royal Swedish Academy of Engineering Science's Gold Medal in 2019 for, according to the citation, "his contributions to our understanding of humanity’s place in the cosmos and the opportunities and risks associated with artificial intelligence. He has courageously tackled these existential questions in his research and, in a commendable way, succeeded in communicating the issues to a wider public."

Tegmark is interviewed in the 2018 documentary on artificial intelligence Do You Trust This Computer?

He is also known for his seminal paper on the Mathematical Universe Hypothesis, in which he claims that our physical world is an abstract mathematical structure with an infinite number of initial random conditions. He points to fractals as proof that the equations used to describe all possible mathematical multiverses would fit on a single T-shirt.

Personal life
He married astrophysicist Angelica de Oliveira-Costa in 1997, and divorced in 2009. They have two sons. On August 5, 2012, Tegmark married Meia Chita.

In the media
 In 2006, Tegmark was one of fifty scientists interviewed by New Scientist about their predictions for the future. His prediction: "In 50 years, you may be able to buy T-shirts on which are printed equations describing the unified laws of our universes."
 Tegmark appears in the  2007 documentary Parallel Worlds, Parallel Lives in which he is interviewed by Mark Oliver Everett, son of the founder of the many-worlds interpretation of quantum mechanics, Hugh Everett.
 Tegmark also appears in "Who's afraid of a big black hole?", "What time is it?", "To Infinity and Beyond", "Is Everything We Know About The Universe Wrong?", "What is Reality?" and "Which Universe Are We In?", all part of the BBC's Horizon scientific series of programmes.
 He appears in several episodes of Sci Fi Science: Physics of the Impossible, an American documentary television series on Science which first aired in the United States on December 1, 2009. The series is hosted by theoretical physicist Michio Kaku.
 Tegmark was interviewed by Morgan Freeman in seasons 2 and 3 of Through the Wormhole in 2011–2012.
 Tegmark participated in the episode "Zooming Out" of BBC World Service's The Forum, which first aired on BBC Radio 4 on April 26, 2014.
 In 2014, Tegmark co-authored an op-ed in The Huffington Post with Stephen Hawking, Frank Wilczek and Stuart Russell on the movie Transcendence.
 In 2014, "The Perpetual Earth Program," a play based on Tegmark's book Our Mathematical Universe, was mounted in New York City as part of the Planet Connections Theatre Festival.
 In 2014, featured in The Principle, a documentary examining the Copernican Principle.
 In 2015, Tegmark participated in an episode of Sam Harris' the Waking Up podcast entitled "The Multiverse & You (& You & You & You...)" where they discussed topics such as artificial intelligence and the mathematical universe hypothesis.
 In 2017, Tegmark gave a talk entitled "Effective altruism, existential risk & existential hope" at the world's largest annual conference of the effective altruism movement. 
 In 2017, Tegmark participated in an episode of Sam Harris' the Waking Up podcast entitled "The Future of Intelligence" where they discussed topics such as artificial intelligence and definitions of life.
 In 2018, Tegmark took part in a conversation with AI researcher Lex Fridman about Artificial General Intelligence as part of a MIT course on AGI. He was the first guest on Lex Fridman podcast. He was interviewed again on the Lex Fridman podcast in 2021.

Works
 Our Mathematical Universe (2014)
 Life 3.0: Being Human in the Age of Artificial Intelligence (2017)

See also
List of astronomers
List of physicists

References

External links

 

1967 births
21st-century American astronomers
Swedish expatriates in the United States
Swedish cosmologists
Living people
Massachusetts Institute of Technology School of Science faculty
KTH Royal Institute of Technology alumni
Stockholm School of Economics alumni
20th-century Swedish astronomers
Swedish people of Jewish descent
20th-century American physicists
MIT Center for Theoretical Physics faculty
Quantum mind
People associated with effective altruism
Fellows of the American Physical Society